Martin Diedenhofen (born 5 February 1995) is a German politician of the Social Democratic Party (SPD) who has been serving as a Member of the German Bundestag since 2021.

Political career
Diedenhofen ran unsuccessfully in Neuwied in 2017 but eventually became of the German Parliament in the 2021 elections, representing the Neuwied district. He has since been serving on the Committee on Housing, Urban Development, Building and Local Government.

Other activities
 Education and Science Workers' Union (GEW), Member

See also 

 List of members of the 20th Bundestag

References 

1995 births
Living people
21st-century German politicians
Members of the Bundestag for Rhineland-Palatinate
Members of the Bundestag for the Social Democratic Party of Germany
Members of the Bundestag 2021–2025